Just a Souvenir is the ninth album by Squarepusher, which was widely released on 27 October 2008. The album had been available to purchase as a download from bleep.com on 15 September 2008.

The album originated in a daydream, in which Tom Jenkinson envisioned a rock band performing a concert against the backdrop of a large, glowing coathanger. The performance quickly became surreal: among other things, a river forces the band to kayak whilst performing; the guitarist is able to accelerate or decelerate time at will; and every drum in the drummer's kit begins to switch places with each another. As such, the majority of the album consists of Jenkinson's own version of jazz fusion, threaded through with classical guitar, math rock and funk recordings.

Track listing

References

External links
Guardian.co.uk

2008 albums
Squarepusher albums
Warp (record label) albums